The 2013–14 Charleston Southern Buccaneers men's basketball team represented Charleston Southern University during the 2013–14 NCAA Division I men's basketball season. The Buccaneers, led by ninth year head coach Barclay Radebaugh, played their home games at the CSU Field House and were members of the South Division of the Big South Conference. They finished the season 13–18, 6–10 in Big South play to in fifth place in the South Division. They advanced to the quarterfinals of the Big South Conference tournament where they lost to Coastal Carolina.

Roster

Schedule

|-
!colspan=9 style="background:#002649; color:#C5B35B;"| Regular season

|-
!colspan=9 style="background:#002649; color:#C5B35B;"| Big South tournament

References

Charleston Southern Buccaneers men's basketball seasons
Charleston Southern
Charleston Southern Buc
Charleston Southern Buc